At least two warships of Japan have been named Sōryū:

, an aircraft carrier launched in 1935 and sunk in 1942.
, a  launched in 2007.

Japanese Navy ship names